David Garrett (born 1957) is a lawyer and former member of the New Zealand House of Representatives. He entered parliament at the 2008 general election as a list MP for ACT New Zealand, having been ranked fifth on that party's list. He was ACT's spokesman on law and order until he resigned from the party on 17 September 2010. On 23 September 2010, he resigned from Parliament, following revelations that he had fraudulently obtained a passport in the name of a deceased infant in 1984.

Early years

David Garrett was born in 1957 in Gisborne, where he grew up as one of six children. He went to school at Campion College, Gisborne, before working on oil rigs, initially in the North Sea but later elsewhere around the world for almost a decade. He attended Canterbury University between 1986 and 1992, where he completed a Bachelor of Arts and a law degree. In New Zealand Garrett became a member of the Socialist Unity Party and was a Labour Party activist. He also worked as a lawyer and a pro-bono legal adviser to the Sensible Sentencing Trust.

Member of Parliament

He joined the ACT party three months before the 2008 election, when he was approached to stand for ACT in an arrangement made between Rodney Hide, ACT leader, and Garth McVicar, chairman of the Sensible Sentencing Trust. He was elected as a list MP, having been ranked fifth on the ACT party list. He resigned from the ACT party on September 18, 2010 after the passport fraud incident came to light.  He was formally confirmed as an independent MP at the beginning of the following week but then resigned from Parliament on September 23.

Legislation
Garrett is the author of the "three strikes" legislation which was supported by the National Party and incorporated into the Sentencing and Parole Reform Bill which became law in May 2010. Under this law, certain crimes involving violence or sexual offending are deemed "strike" offences. An offender receives a normal sentence and a warning for a first strike offence, a sentence without parole for a second, and the maximum sentence for the offence without parole for a third.

Criminal offences 
Garrett was convicted of assault in a Tongan Magistrates court in 2002. Notwithstanding that conviction, Garrett was made a Senior Counsel by the then Chief Justice of Tonga four years later, in 2006

In 2010, Garrett admitted in Parliament that he had used the identity of a deceased child to obtain a passport in 1984. He said he used a method shown in the novel The Day of the Jackal, and obtained the birth certificate of a child who died in infancy around the same time Garrett was born. The incident led to a court case being brought against Garrett in 2005; he was discharged without conviction, and the judge in the case ordered his name be suppressed from public record. During the case, Garrett swore a false affidavit to the court. He later pleaded guilty to doing so in front of the  New Zealand Law Society's Lawyers and Conveyancer's Committee. This led to the committee formally censuring him, prohibiting him from practicing law for a period of one year, and ordering him to pay $8430 costs.

In 2011, Garrett pleaded guilty to one charge of drunk driving. He was fined $550 plus costs, and disqualified from driving for six months.

After parliament 

Garrett returned to Auckland and continues to practice law, in Tonga.

Further reading 
 (2011) NZLCDT 29  LCDT 009/11

Notes

References

ACT New Zealand MPs
Living people
Place of birth missing (living people)
1958 births
New Zealand list MPs
Independent MPs of New Zealand
Members of the New Zealand House of Representatives
People educated at Campion College, Gisborne
21st-century New Zealand politicians